The Norman R. "Bud" Poile Trophy is presented annually to the American Hockey League (AHL) team that finishes with the best regular season record in the Western Conference. The award is named after former Hockey Hall of Famer Bud Poile. Previously, it was awarded to winner of the West Division (2002–2003), and Midwest Division (2012–2015).

Winners

Winner by season

See also
Norman R. "Bud" Poile Trophy (IHL)

References

External links
Official AHL website
AHL Hall of Fame Trophies

American Hockey League trophies and awards